The Social Leper is a 1917 American silent drama film directed by Harley Knoles and starring Carlyle Blackwell, Arthur Ashley and June Elvidge.

Cast
 Carlyle Blackwell as John Dean 
 Arthur Ashley as Robert Warren 
 June Elvidge as Adrienne Van Couver 
 George MacQuarrie as Henry Armstrong 
 Isabel Berwin as Mrs. Stephen Barkley 
 Evelyn Greeley as Lorraine Barkley 
 Eugenie Woodward as Mrs. Dean 
 Edna Whistler as Madame Melvina

References

Bibliography
 Cari Beauchamp. Without Lying Down: Frances Marion and the Powerful Women of Early Hollywood. University of California Press, 1998.

External links
 

1917 films
1917 drama films
1910s English-language films
American silent feature films
Silent American drama films
Films directed by Harley Knoles
American black-and-white films
World Film Company films
1910s American films